Larry Steinbachek (1960-2016) was an English-singer songwriter, director and composer best known for his time as part of Bronski Beat with Jimmy Somerville and Steve Bronski.

Early life
Steinbachek was born in London on 6 May 1960. He worked as an electrician and was studying to be a musician prior to forming Bronski Beat with Jimmy Somerville and Steve Bronski.

Career
Steinbachek joined Bronski Beat in 1983 and was one of the song writers for most of the band's songs such as "Smalltown Boy", "Why?" and "Hit That Perfect Beat". He and the band also collaborated with Marc Almond on a medley cover of both "I Feel Love" and "Johnny, Remember Me". Somerville left the band in 1987 to form The Communards with Richard Coles who also worked with Bronski Beat. Steinbachek and Bronski were then joined by both John Foster (who sang on "Hit That Perfect Beat") and Jonathan Hellyer (who sang on "I Love Night Life"). In 1995, Steinbachek left the band and was replaced by Ian Donaldson.

After leaving Bronski Beat, Steinbachek moved to Amsterdam and then back to England. He worked as a composer and theatre director until his death. He was involved in the 2015 movie, Chappie where he was one of the composers of the soundtrack. He co-wrote "Beat Boy" with former-Bronski Beat member Steve Bronski and it was sung by the alternative hip hop group, Die Antwoord. He also became the musical director for Michael Laub's theatre company, Remote Control Productions, in 1995 following his departure from Bronski Beat.

Personal life and death
Steinbachek had a sister, Louise Jones. He was openly gay and, like the other members of Bronski Beat, wrote about the politics around gay culture and the oppression in the 1980s towards gay people. He was good friends with Steve Bronski and Jimmy Somerville. 

He died after a short battle with cancer at the age of 56. His fellow band member, Steve Bronski, died on the same date in 2021 from smoke inhalation.

References

1960 births
2016 deaths
20th-century English LGBT people
20th-century English male singers
21st-century English LGBT people
21st-century English male singers
british synth-pop new wave musicians
Bronski Beat members
Deaths from cancer in England
Gay singers
English LGBT singers
Musicians from London
English new wave musicians
English gay musicians